INSPIRE-HEP is an open access digital library for the field of high energy physics (HEP). It is the successor of the Stanford Physics Information Retrieval System (SPIRES) database, the main literature database for high energy physics since the 1970s.

History
SPIRES was (in addition to the CERN Document Server (CDS), arXiv and parts of Astrophysics Data System) one of the main Particle Information Resources. A survey conducted in 2007  found that SPIRES database users wanted the portal to provide more services than the, at that time, already 30-year-old system could provide. On the second annual Summit of Information Specialists in Particle Physics and Astrophysics in May 2008, the physics laboratories CERN, DESY, SLAC and Fermilab therefore announced that they would work together to create a new Scientific Information System for high energy physics called INSPIRE. It interacts with other HEP service providers like arXiv.org, Particle Data Group, NASA's Astrophysics Data System. and HEPdata. In April 2010, a beta version of INSPIRE-HEP was freely accessible, in April 2012, it fully replaced SPIRES. A new and upgraded INSPIRE platform was officially released in March 2020.

Content
INSPIRE-HEP combines the SPIRES-HEP database content with the open source digital library software Invenio and the content of the CERN Document server. In addition to scientific papers, INSPIRE-HEP provides other information such-as citation metrics, plots extracted from papers or internal experiment notes and tools for users to improve metadata like crowdsourcing for author disambiguation. As of August 2012, INSPIRE-HEP contains 1.1 million records. INSPIRE provides not only a literature database for the field of High-Energy Physics, but for other HEP-related services:
	HEPNames: a comprehensive directory of people involved in High-Energy Physics
	Institutions: a database compiling over 7000 institutes related to the HEP field; included in the information about each institute is a link to all the papers in INSPIRE-HEP that are associated with the institution as well as a list of people (taken from HEPNames) 
	Conferences: a collection of HEP meetings and conferences
	Jobs: a listing of academic and research jobs of interest to the community in high energy physics, nuclear physics, accelerator physics and astrophysics
	Experiments: a database containing summaries of HEP and HEP-related experiments from different labs and locations around the world

See also 
List of academic databases and search engines

References

Citations

Sources 

 Gentil-Beccot, A., Mele S., Holtkamp, A., O’Connell, H., and Brooks, T. (2008). Information Resources in High-Energy Physics. Surveying the Present Landscape and Charting the Future Course, 
 Warner, S., and Rieger, O. (2010). Developing Sustainability Strategies for arXiv. Information Standards Quarterly 22, 2-4. 
 Gülzow, V., and Kemp, Y. (2012). Teilchenphysik. In: Neuroth, H. et al. (ed.). Langzeitarchivierung von Forschungsdaten. Eine Bestandsaufnahme, 257-274 
 DPHEP Study Group (2012). Status Report of the DPHEP Study Group: Towards a Global Effort for Sustainable Data Preservation in High Energy Physics. arXiv:1205.4667

External links
 INSPIRE-HEP database
 INSPIRE-HEP website

Bibliographic databases and indexes
Discipline-oriented digital libraries
Open-access archives
Full-text scholarly online databases
Particle physics journals